Barbara Barbaze (January 17, 1923 – April 21, 2013) was a Canadian outfielder who played in the All-American Girls Professional Baseball League. She batted and threw right handed.

Born in Toronto, Ontario, Barbara Barbaze was one of the 68 players born in Canada to join the All-American Girls Professional Baseball League in its twelve years history. A fleet-footed outfielder and fast base runner, she joined the Springfield Sallies during the 1948 season. She was not located after leaving the league in that season.

In 1998, Barbaze gained honorary induction into the Canadian Baseball Hall of Fame. She is also part of the AAGPBL permanent display at the Baseball Hall of Fame and Museum at Cooperstown, New York, which was unveiled in 1988 to honor the entire All-American Girls Professional Baseball League.

Career statistics
Batting 

Fielding

Sources

All-American Girls Professional Baseball League players
Baseball outfielders
Baseball players from Toronto
Canadian expatriate baseball players in the United States
Springfield Sallies players
1923 births
2013 deaths
21st-century American women